Daniel James Giordano (born September 17, 1989) is a former American football linebacker. He played college football at the University of Cincinnati.

Professional career

Arizona Cardinals
On April 27, 2013, he signed with the Arizona Cardinals as an undrafted free agent. Giordano spent his entire rookie season on the Physically unable to perform list, after he signed as a rookie free agent out of Cincinnati.  Giordano was released by the Cardinals in April 2014.

Hamilton Tiger-Cats
Giordano signed with the Hamilton Tiger-Cats in March 2015 and retired in May 2015.

References

External links
Cincinnati bio
Arizona Cardinals bio

Living people
Arizona Cardinals players
Hamilton Tiger-Cats players
Players of American football from Illinois
Cincinnati Bearcats football players
American football linebackers
Canadian football defensive linemen
American players of Canadian football
1989 births
People from Frankfort, Illinois